Lý Tòng Bá (14 November 1931, in Long Xuyên – 22 February 2015, in Las Vegas, Nevada) was a brigadier general of the South Vietnamese Army of the Republic of Vietnam.

He led operations including Operation Lam Son II. In the September 1964 South Vietnamese coup attempt as head of the 7th Division's armored section he supported General Dương Văn Đức's coup attempt. During the Easter Offensive in 1972, he commanded the 23rd Division and successfully defended Kontum against the North Vietnamese attack.

References

1931 births
2015 deaths
Vietnam War prisoners of war
Army of the Republic of Vietnam generals
Vietnamese emigrants to the United States